The Brooklyn Trust Company was a New York City bank.

History
The company was chartered in 1866. In 1873 it had difficulties resulting in a brief suspension of operations.  Between 1913 and 1930 the company acquired five other banks through mergers. The company merged into the Manufacturers Trust Company on October 13, 1950.  At the time of the merger the Brooklyn Trust Company had 26 branches.

George Vincent McLaughlin was president of the Brooklyn Trust Company starting in 1940.
Charles Jeremiah Mason, Jr. (1899–1990) joined the Brooklyn Trust Company in 1939. He was an assistant vice-president at Brooklyn Trust Company when it merged with Manufacturers Hanover in 1950. He became an assistant vice-president at Manufacturers Hanover in 1953 and vice-president in 1955, retiring in 1964.
William Boone Nauts (1902–1990) joined the Brooklyn Trust Company in 1925. During the Depression he joined the Manufacturers Trust Company. He retired in 1967 as a vice-president of Manufacturers Hanover Trust.

Headquarters building
The former headquarters of the Brooklyn Trust Company is a historic bank building located at the corner of Montague and Clinton Streets in Brooklyn Heights. The Italian Renaissance-inspired headquarters was built between 1913 and 1916 by the architectural firm of York and Sawyer.  It was modeled after the Palazzo della Gran Guardia in Verona.

The building was built on the same site as the bank's previous headquarters.  Marc Eidlitz & Son Builders N.Y.C. constructed the building in two phases. The first half was begun at the corner of Clinton and Pierrepont Streets in late 1913 and was finished in September 1915. The second phase began in October 1915 and was completed in August 1916. The entire construction process was photographed monthly by Irving Underhill.

The main interior space is inspired by ancient Roman and Italian Renaissance architecture. The banking hall has large chandeliers hanging from vaulted, coffered ceilings, arched windows, and a Cosmati-style mosaic marble floor. The building was landmarked in 1996. The interior is also landmarked. It was listed on the National Register of Historic Places in 2009.

The building was sold for $9.7 million in 2007 by JPMorgan Chase, the successor to the Brooklyn Trust Company through the Manufacturers Trust Company. It was bought by Brookfield Asset Management who in turn sold it to Stahl Real Estate Company.  The building is occupied primarily by a law firm but Chase Bank still leases the ground floor to maintain a retail banking branch.

Gallery

References

Banks based in New York City
JPMorgan Chase
Bank buildings on the National Register of Historic Places in New York City
Commercial buildings in Brooklyn
Renaissance Revival architecture in New York City
Commercial buildings completed in 1916
Brooklyn Heights
Brooklyn Dodgers owners
Defunct banks of the United States
National Register of Historic Places in Brooklyn
New York City Designated Landmarks in Brooklyn
New York City interior landmarks